Oman ypsilon, the Oman blenny, is a species of combtooth blenny found in the western Indian ocean, around Oman.  This fish reaches a length of  TL.  It is the only known species in the genus Oman.

References

Blenniinae
Fish described in 1985
Taxa named by Victor G. Springer
Monotypic fish genera